Eloïse Jure (born 5 April 2001) is a French ice hockey player for Brûleurs de Loups and the French national team.

She represented France at the 2019 IIHF Women's World Championship.

References

External links

2001 births
Living people
French women's ice hockey defencemen
People from Saint-Martin-d'Hères
Sportspeople from Isère